The San'ao Nuclear Power Plant is a nuclear reactor under construction in the Zhejiang province of eastern China. It is planned to house 6 reactors, at least two of which will be pressurised water reactors.

Construction 
Construction of the plant was authorized in May 2015 by the Chinese government. The plant is being constructed by the Cangnan Nuclear Power Company, under the aegis of the state-owned China General Nuclear Power Group. Construction of the first unit began on 31 December 2020 and construction of the second unit on 30 December 2021. The first unit is expected to begin operation in 2026, and the second unit in 2027.

The plant is expected to produce 52.5 terawatt-hours of energy per year and will supply the larger Yangtze River Delta region.

See also

Nuclear power in China

References

Nuclear power stations in China
Power stations in Zhejiang